The Crunch is an English/Swedish power pop group that is influenced by rock and punk.

Career
The Crunch started January 2013 after Sulo met the members when writing the book Keep Yourself Alive in 2012. The first single "Down by the border", was released on 7" vinyl and a YouTube video on 3 June 2013, recorded at Berry Street Studio. The next single  "Fire Again" was released for download and a YouTube video 14 October 2013. The full album "Busy making noise" was released 28 of October (Legal Records) on CD, Vinyl and download. Third single, a duet with Sulo and Swedish singer Idde Schultz called "A Little Bit of Grace" was released as a YouTube video and download 9 of December 2013 .

The first gig the band did was at The Garage in London on 5 June 2013. 

2015 the band's second album "Brand New Brand" was released, funded through Music Pledge and distributed through Cargo Records.

Members
 Sören "Sulo" Karlsson (frontman) from The Diamond Dogs
 Mick Geggus (guitar) from Cockney Rejects
 Dave Tregunna (bass) from Sham 69 and The Lords of the New Church
 Idde Schultz (Keyboard and backup vocals) 
 Terry Chimes (drums) from The Clash.

Discography
Busy Making Noise - 2013 Legal Records
Brand New Brand - 2015

References

External links
 http://www.reverbnation.com/thecrunchcommunity
 http://www.facebook.com/thecrunchcommunity
 http://www.thecrunch.london

Swedish pop music groups
Musical groups established in 2013